Troika is a 1930 German drama film directed by Vladimir Strizhevsky and starring Hans Adalbert Schlettow, Hilde von Stolz and Olga Tschechowa. Originally shot as a silent film, a soundtrack and sound effects were subsequently added.

The film's sets were designed by the art directors Jacek Rotmil and Heinz Fenchel.

Cast
 Hans Adalbert Schlettow as Boris, Troika dealer 
 Hilde von Stolz as Natascha, Boris' wife 
 Olga Tschechowa as Vera Walowa 
 Michael Chekhov as Paschka, village idiot 
 Friedrich Gnaß as Stephan, troika driver 
 Alexander Polonsky as Nobleman 
 Angelo Ferrari as Tenor 
 Ernst Paul Hempel as Cavalry Captain 
 Boris Alekin as Student 
 Edgar Pauly as Geck 
 Betty Waid as Mother Superior
 Maria Cebotari as Singer

References

Bibliography
 Bock, Hans-Michael & Bergfelder, Tim. The Concise Cinegraph: Encyclopaedia of German Cinema. Berghahn Books, 2009.
 Rollberg, Peter. Historical Dictionary of Russian and Soviet Cinema. Scarecrow Press, 2008.

External links

1930 films
1930 drama films
German drama films
Films of the Weimar Republic
1930s German-language films
Films directed by Vladimir Strizhevsky
Transitional sound drama films
German black-and-white films
1930s German films